Cat People may refer to:

 Cat People (1942 film), a horror film starring Simone Simon
 Cat People (1982 film), a remake of the 1942 film starring Nastassja Kinski
 "Cat People (Putting Out Fire)", a song by David Bowie and the title song from the 1982 film
 Cat People (TV series), a 2021 American Netflix documentary series
 Cat People (comics), a humanoid species from the Marvel Comics universe
 Cat people and dog people, personality types

See also
 Catwoman (disambiguation)
 Catgirl (disambiguation)
 Catman (disambiguation)
 Cat (Red Dwarf), a fictional character in the sitcom Red Dwarf
 "Cat Person", 2017 short story in the New Yorker